Cleveland County (formerly Dorsey County) is a county located in the U.S. state of Arkansas. Its population was 7,550 at the 2020 U.S. census. The county seat and largest city is Rison.

Cleveland County is included in the Pine Bluff, AR Metropolitan Statistical Area, which is also included in the Little Rock-North Little Rock, AR Combined Statistical Area.

History
The Arkansas legislature established Dorsey County as Arkansas's 71st county on April 17, 1873, naming it for Stephen W. Dorsey, the U.S. Senator from Arkansas. When he was indicted for defrauding the Post Office, they renamed it on March 5, 1885, for Grover Cleveland, the newly elected President of the United States.

The Battle of Mark's Mills, the pivotal engagement in the Union Army's ill-fated Camden Expedition during the U.S. Civil War, took place in what is now Cleveland County.  This engagement resulted in a crushing victory for Confederate forces, though the victory ultimately proved to be hollow when Federal General Frederick Steele and the rest of his army managed to escape from Camden to Little Rock.

Geography

Major highways

 U.S. Highway 63
 U.S. Highway 79
 U.S. Highway 167
 Highway 8
 Highway 11
 Highway 15 (now US 63)
 Highway 35
 Highway 54
 Highway 97
 Highway 114
 Highway 133
 Highway 189
 Highway 212

Adjacent counties
 Grant County (northwest)
 Jefferson County (northeast)
 Lincoln County (east)
 Drew County (southeast)
 Bradley County (south)
 Calhoun County (southwest)
 Dallas County (west)

Demographics

2020 census

As of the 2020 United States census, there were 7,550 people, 3,217 households, and 2,254 families residing in the county.

2000 census
As of the 2000 United States Census, there were 8,571 people, 3,273 households, and 2,513 families residing in the county.  The population density was 14 people per square mile (6/km2).  There were 3,834 housing units at an average density of 6 per square mile (2/km2).  The racial makeup of the county was 84.79% White, 13.22% Black or African American, 0.32% Native American, 0.14% Asian, 0.04% Pacific Islander, 0.68% from other races, and 0.83% from two or more races.  1.62% of the population were Hispanic or Latino of any race.

There were 3,273 households, out of which 34.90% had children under the age of 18 living with them, 62.70% were married couples living together, 9.90% had a female householder with no husband present, and 23.20% were non-families. 21.40% of all households were made up of individuals, and 10.00% had someone living alone who was 65 years of age or older.  The average household size was 2.60 and the average family size was 3.00.

In the county, the population was spread out, with 26.20% under the age of 18, 7.90% from 18 to 24, 27.70% from 25 to 44, 24.70% from 45 to 64, and 13.60% who were 65 years of age or older.  The median age was 37 years. For every 100 females, there were 95.40 males.  For every 100 females age 18 and over, there were 93.20 males.

The median income for a household in the county was $32,405, and the median income for a family was $38,164. Males had a median income of $31,282 versus $21,172 for females. The per capita income for the county was $15,362.  About 11.40% of families and 15.20% of the population were below the poverty line, including 21.50% of those under age 18 and 15.70% of those age 65 or over.

Communities

Cities
 Kingsland
 Rison (county seat)

Census-designated places
 New Edinburg
 Rye
 Staves
 Woodlawn

Townships

 Bowman
 Hudgin
 Harper (Herbine)
 Hurricane (CDP Rye)
 Kingsland (Kingsland)
 Lee
 Miller (CDP Woodlawn)
 Niven-Jackson
 Redland (CDP New Edinburg)
 Rison (Rison)
 Rowell
 Saline
 Smith
 White Oak (CDP Staves)
 Whiteville (Randall)

Government
Cleveland County has trended heavily towards the Republican Party in recent presidential elections. As of 2020 the last Democrat to carry the county was Bill Clinton, an Arkansas native, in 1996.

Education
School districts serving portions of the county:
 Cleveland County School District
 Malvern Special School District
 Star City School District
 Woodlawn School District

Notable people
 Monroe Schwarzlose, a turkey farmer and political maverick who polled 31 percent of the vote against Governor Bill Clinton in the 1980 Democratic primary. He won in Cleveland County.
 Harvey Parnell, the 29th governor of Arkansas, 1928-1933
 Youell Swinney, the only major suspect in the Texarkana Phantom slayings, hailed from Cleveland County. He was the son of a Baptist minister.
 Johnny Cash was born in Kingsland.
 Coach Paul "Bear" Bryant was born in Moro Bottom.
 Tyrell Johnson plays safety in the NFL was born and raised in Rison.

See also
 List of lakes in Cleveland County, Arkansas
 National Register of Historic Places listings in Cleveland County, Arkansas

References

External links
 The Encyclopedia of Arkansas History & Culture

 
1873 establishments in Arkansas
Pine Bluff metropolitan area
Little Rock–North Little Rock–Conway metropolitan area
Populated places established in 1873